The All-Russian Central Executive Committee (VTsIK) was the highest legislative, administrative and revising body of the Russian Soviet Federative Socialist Republic (Russian SFSR) from 1917 until 1937. Although the All-Russian Congress of Soviets had supreme authority, in periods between its sessions its powers were passed to VTsIK.

Organization
The 1918 Russian Constitution required that the VTsIK convene the All-Russian Congress of Soviets no fewer than two times a year (Statute 26 of Article III). Additional Congresses could be called by the VTsIK or on the request of local Soviets. The VTsIK was elected by a full Congress, with no more than 200 individuals. It was completely subordinate to the Congress. The functions of the Collegiate or the Presidium were not declared in the Constitution, but presumably they were supposed to be purely supervisory or revisionary bodies.

Provisions
VTsIK gave a general direction for the policies of the Worker-Peasant government and all bodies of the Soviet power in the country. It united and coordinated activities for legislation and administration as well as supervised the endorsement of the Soviet Constitution, declarations of the All-Russian Congress of Soviets and central bodies of the Soviet power. The All-Russian Central Executive Committee reviewed and adopted the projects of decrees and other propositions introduced by the Council of People's Commissars and separate departments as well as issued its own decrees and instructions.

VTsIK summoned the All-Russian Congress of Soviets to which it presented the reports on its activity, general policy, and other inquiries. The All-Russian Central Executive Committee formed the Council of People's Commissars for general administrative affairs of the republic and departments (called People's Commissariats) for the management of separate branches of administration. Deputies of the VTsIK worked in the departments or executed special assignments of the All-Russian Central Executive Committee.

The state budget was defined by both VTsIK and All-Russian Congress of Soviets together, in addition to defining the budgets of different regions, districts, towns and cities.

History
The All-Russian Central Executive Committee was first elected at the First All-Russian Congress of Workers' and Soldiers' Deputies' Soviets, held in Petrograd, June 3–24, 1917. The first Central Executive Committee of the All-Russian Congress of Soviets was not a governing body and its chairman Nikolai Chkheidze was not the head of Russian state. This changed at the Second All-Russian Congress of Soviets during the October Revolution.

The Second All-Russian Congress of Workers' and Soldiers' Deputies' Soviets held in Petrograd in November 1917 elected the second Central Executive Committee. This then became the executive body of the RSFSR.

It was composed of
62 Bolsheviks
29 Left SRs
10 Mensheviks and Right SRs

The first chairman of the VTsIK was Lev Kamenev, who directed the day-to-day work of the committee. He only cast a vote if there was an even split in the committee.

The full name at one time was All-Russian Central Executive Committee of Workers', Peasants', Red Army, and Cossack Deputies (Всероссийский Центральный Исполнительный Комитет Советов рабочих, крестьянских, красноармейских и казачьих депутатов).

From the formation of the Soviet Union in 1922, it downgraded from the highest level (federal) to the second-highest level (federal-republic) of a governing body.

Following the adoption of the 1936 Soviet Constitution, this organ was replaced with the Presidium of the Supreme Soviet of the Russian SFSR.

Chairmen of the Central Executive Committee of the RSFSR
 Lev Kamenev (November 9–21, 1917)
 Yakov Sverdlov (November 21, 1917 – March 16, 1919; died in office)
 Mikhail Vladimirsky (acting; March 16–30, 1919)
 Mikhail Kalinin (March 30, 1919 – July 15, 1938)

On December 30, 1922, the Soviet Union was formed. It comprised the Russian SFSR and other communist-controlled Soviet republics.  Mikhail Kalinin retained his position as chairman of the Central Executive Committee of the All-Russian Congress of Soviets and became chairman of the newly formed Central Executive Committee of the All-Union Congress of Soviets as well. Both positions were mostly ceremonial, increasingly so in later years.

See also
 
 
 Supreme Soviet

References

Government of the Soviet Union
Historical legislatures
Russian Soviet Federative Socialist Republic
1917 establishments in Russia
1938 disestablishments in the Soviet Union